Burchard IV or Bouchard IV (1182–1244) was the lord of Avesnes and Étrœungt. He was the son of James of Avesnes and Adela of Guise and brother of Walter, Count of Blois.

Bouchard began his career as a cantor and subdeacon in the church of Laon. In 1212, he was named bailiff of Hainaut. In this capacity, he served as tutor and guardian of the young Margaret, sister of Joanna, Countess of Flanders and Hainault. He later married Margaret in 1212, though she was only ten years old and the marriage could not be consummated. Neither Joanna nor Count Ferdinand gave their consent, and tried to have the marriage stopped, they failed.

Bouchard lived a war-like life. He invaded the territory of his brother Walter, who had received most of their patrimony. He then invaded Flanders and forced Joanna and Ferdinand to recognise his marriage to Margaret. He then fought at the Battle of Bouvines in 1214, under the (losing) Flemish banner. Philip Augustus, the king of France and victor of Bouvines, then counselled the pope, Innocent III, to declare the marriage of Bouchard and Margaret illegal. Innocent eventually excommunicated Bouchard on 19 January 1216. They took refuge in Luxembourg. In 1219, Bouchard was captured in battle and would be imprisoned in Ghent for two years. To obtain his release, Margaret accepted the dissolution of the marriage and Bouchard left for Italy to fight for the Holy See. Upon his return, he was decapitated at Rupelmonde on the orders of Joanna.

Bouchard and Margaret had three children, who played an important part in the War of the Succession of Flanders and Hainault:

 Baldwin (1217–1219), took refuge with his parents in Luxembourg
 John I (1218–1257), later Count of Hainault
 Baldwin (1219–1295), Lord of Beaumont

References

Avesnes family
Lords of Avesnes
People excommunicated by the Catholic Church
1182 births
1244 deaths